A.R. Monex Pro Cycling Team is a UCI Continental cycling team registered in San Marino. Though the team is registered in San Marino, being the first team to do so since  in 2009, the team is made up of mostly Mexican riders and staff. The team was founded in 2021 by brothers Luis and Alejandro Rodríguez Acevedo of Benito Juarez, Mexico, with a focus on fostering under-23 Mexican talent.

Team roster

References

External links
 
 

Cycling teams established in 2021
Cycling teams based in San Marino
UCI Continental Teams (Europe)